The Girl and the Millionaire is a 1965 Danish comedy film directed by Ebbe Langberg and starring Dirch Passer.

Cast
Dirch Passer as Direktør Jens Møller
Birgitte Bruun as Koncertpianist Marlene Brandt
Malene Schwartz as Britta
Sigrid Horne-Rasmussen as Fru J.O. Sand
Bodil Steen as Conny
Jessie Rindom as Frk. Nielsen
Johnna Lillebjerg as Lis
Jeanne Darville as Ester
Paul Hagen as Butler Morris
Ove Sprogøe as Advokat Andersen
Axel Strøbye as Max
Karl Stegger as Betjent
Preben Mahrt as Kontorchef hos Jens Møller
Jesper Langberg as Sælger Mikkelsen
Mogens Brandt as Overtjener
Carl-Gustaf Lindstedt as Direktør J.O. Sand
Jan Priiskorn-Schmidt as Orla
Birger Jensen as Receptionist hos Jens Møller
Bent Fabricius-Bjerre as Pianist (uncredited)
Ebbe Langberg as Mand på gaden (uncredited)
Ghita Nørby as Kvinde på gaden (uncredited)

External links

1965 films
1965 comedy films
1960s Danish-language films
Danish comedy films
Films directed by Ebbe Langberg